Nathan D. Champion (September 29, 1857 – April 9, 1892) — known as Nate Champion — was a key figure in the Johnson County War of April 1892. Falsely accused by a wealthy Wyoming cattlemen's association of being a rustler, Champion was the first person targeted by a band of hit men hired by the cattlemen. In reality, Champion was simply a small rancher who stood up against the big cattlemen's practice of claiming all unbranded young cattle on the range. He is celebrated for his heroic stand in his besieged cabin and for a heartfelt letter written at the time describing the events.

Biography

Early life

Nate Champion was born 29 September 1857 in Leander, Texas. His parents were John and Naomi Champion. One of eighteen brothers and sisters, he grew up in the Round Rock area. His father served as sheriff of Williamson County for while his Aunt Hattie Cluck drove her own cattle to market in Abilene, Kansas in 1871. With the money she and her husband George purchased the land that would become Cedar Park. Like most footloose cowboys of that area he worked his way north to Wyoming where he worked for several ranches before building his own spread.

The Johnson County War
The dramatic events of 1892 took place against a background of violent conflict over land use that stretched from 1889 to 1909. Historian Richard Maxwell Brown refers to the events in Wyoming as part of a wider "Western Civil War of Incorporation."

In the early days in Wyoming, most of the land was in the public domain, open both to stockraising as open range and to homesteading. Large numbers of cattle were turned loose on the open range by large ranches, sometimes financed by other investors. In the spring a roundup was held and the cows and the calves belonging to each ranch were separated and the calves branded. Before the roundup, sometimes calves, especially orphan or stray calves, were surreptitiously branded, and thus taken. The large ranches, concerned about this practice, forbade their employees from owning cattle and aggressively defended against rustling.

The situation became steadily worse after the poor winter of 1886. The large companies began to aggressively appropriate land and control the flow and supply of water in this area; they justified these excesses on what was public land by using the catch-all allegation of rustling, and vigorously sought to exclude the smaller ranchers from participation in the annual roundup; apparently agents of the larger ranches killed several alleged rustlers. A number of lynchings of alleged rustlers took place in 1889, including the double lynching of innocent homesteaders and ranchers Ella Watson and Jim Averell.

The large ranches were organized as the Wyoming Stock Growers Association (the WSGA) and gathered socially as the Cheyenne Club in Cheyenne, Wyoming. In April 1892 the WSGA hired killers from Texas; an expedition of 50 men was organized, which proceeded by train from Cheyenne to Casper, Wyoming, then toward Johnson County, intending to eliminate alleged rustlers and also, apparently, to replace the government in Johnson County. Major Frank Wolcott led the Regulators into Johnson County. To prevent an alarm, the telegraph lines out of Buffalo were cut. The expedition was accompanied by two newspaper reporters whose lurid accounts later appeared in the eastern newspapers.

Attack on Champion
The first target of the WSGA was Nate Champion at the "KC Ranch". Champion was a small rancher who was active in the efforts of small ranchers to organize a competing roundup. Three men besides Champion were at the KC. Two men, evidently trappers, who had taken shelter for the night, were captured as they emerged from the cabin early that morning to collect water at the nearby Powder River, while the third, Nick Ray, was shot while standing inside the doorway of the cabin and died a few hours later. The fourth, Nate Champion, was besieged. Two passers-by noticed the ruckus and rode to Buffalo, where Johnson County Sheriff William "Red" Angus raised a posse of 200 men and set out for the "KC Ranch".

Champion held out for several hours, killing at least four of the vigilantes, and wounding several others. During the siege, Champion kept a poignant journal which contained a number of notes he wrote to friends while taking cover inside the cabin. "Boys, I feel pretty lonesome just now. I wish there was someone here with me so we could watch all sides at once." he wrote. The last journal entry read: "Well, they have just got through shelling the house like hail. I heard them splitting wood. I guess they are going to fire the house tonight. I think I will make a break when night comes, if alive. Shooting again. It's not night yet. The house is all fired. Goodbye, boys, if I never see you again."

With the house on fire, Nate Champion signed his journal entry and put the journal in his pocket before he emerged, running from the back door with a Colt revolver in the left hand and a Winchester rifle in the right. He was gunned down by four men firing simultaneously, hit by 28 bullets. The invaders later pinned a note on Champion's bullet-riddled chest that read "Cattle Thieves Beware". They also  carefully removed entries from the diary which named some of the attackers.

Aftermath of death
The following day the posse led by the sheriff besieged the invading force at the "TA Ranch" on Crazy Woman Creek. After two days, one of the invaders escaped and was able to contact the acting Governor of Wyoming, Amos W. Barber. Frantic efforts to save the besieged invaders ensued, and telegraphs to Washington resulted in intervention by the President of the United States, Benjamin Harrison. The Sixth Cavalry from Fort McKinney was ordered to proceed to the "TA Ranch" and take custody of the invaders and save them from the posse. As part of the surrender, the invaders turned in all their arms and equipment to the Army. Major Wolcott, as unofficial leader of the group made a list of these arms and provided it to the government.

In the end the invaders went free due to cunning legal maneuvers by the defense attorneys. Although many of the leaders of the invaders, such as W. C. Irvine, were themselves Democrats, and their opponents were mostly Democrats. A scandal was caused by the rescue of the Invaders at the order of President Harrison, and the failure of the courts to prosecute them. As a result of the scandal, Wyoming voted Democratic in the elections of 1894.

Dramatic representations
Henry Brandon (1912–1990) played Champion in a 1955 episode of Jim Davis's syndicated western television series, Stories of the Century.
Christopher Walken played a highly fictionalized Champion in Michael Cimino's 1980 film Heaven's Gate.
Tom Berenger is Cain Hammett in Johnson County War. Cain is completely based on the life, actions and looks of Nate Champion.

External links
 The Johnson County War: 1892 Invasion of Northern Wyoming at wyohistory.org

References

1857 births
1892 deaths
Cowboys
People of the American Old West
American cattlemen
People from Johnson County, Wyoming
People from Leander, Texas
People from Round Rock, Texas